Alexander Cozbinov (born 28 April 1995) is a Moldovan tennis player.

Cozbinov has a career high ATP singles ranking of 531 achieved on 19 December 2022. He also has a career high ATP doubles ranking of 237 achieved on 8 August 2022.

Cozbinov represents Moldova at the Davis Cup, where he has a W/L record of 10–5.

Cozbinov plays college tennis at the University of Nevada, Las Vegas between 2015–2018. He won the Mountain West Conference Tennis Player of the Year in 2018.

In January 2020, he participated at the ATP Cup as a member of the Moldovan team. Before his match against Belgian Steve Darcis the organisers played the wrong national anthem, they played the Romanian anthem instead of the Moldovan one.

Future and Challenger finals

Singles: 3 (2–1)

Doubles 18 (13 titles, 5 runners-up)

National participation

Davis Cup (7–1)

   indicates the outcome of the Davis Cup match followed by the score, date, place of event, the zonal classification and its phase, and the court surface.

ATP Cup (1–5)

References

External links

1995 births
Living people
Moldovan male tennis players
Sportspeople from Chișinău
UNLV Rebels athletes
College men's tennis players in the United States
21st-century Moldovan people